Dois Irmãos is a Brazilian miniseries that premiered on 9 January and ended on 20 January 2017. It was developed and directed by Luiz Fernando Carvalho and written by Maria Camargo based on the novel of the same name by Milton Hatoum.

The story runs in three phases featuring identical twin brothers Omar and Yaqub with their family: father Halim,  mother Zana and sister Rânia together with an ensemble cast.

The miniseries stars Cauã Reymond who portrays the two brothers, Antonio Fagundes, Eliane Giardini, Juliana Paes, Irandhir Santos, Maria Fernanda Cândido and Vivianne Pasmanter.

Cast

References

External links
  

2010s television miniseries
2017 Brazilian television series debuts
2017 Brazilian television series endings
Brazilian television miniseries
Portuguese-language television shows
Television series about brothers
Television series about twins
Television series created by Luiz Fernando Carvalho
Television shows set in Manaus